The Church of St. Clare is a former parish church under the authority of the Roman Catholic Archdiocese of New York, at 436-438 West 36th Street in Manhattan, New York City. 

The parish was established in 1903 and staffed by the Franciscan Friars, with a parochial school staffed by a community of Sisters of St. Francis. The 1907 church building, designed by Nicholas Serracino, was closed in 1937 and razed to provide access for the new Lincoln Tunnel. Donatus Buongiorno painted the murals in the church.

References

External links

Christian organizations established in 1903
Closed churches in the Roman Catholic Archdiocese of New York
Closed churches in New York City
Roman Catholic churches in Manhattan
Hell's Kitchen, Manhattan